Guy Singh-Watson (born Guy Watson, 1960) is a British farmer and founder and creator of Riverford, an organic farm and UK-wide organic vegetable box delivery company.

Biography
Singh-Watson was born in Totnes. He was brought up on Riverford Farm, in Buckfastleigh, Devon, which was taken over by his family in the 1950s. After studying Agricultural and Forestry Science at the University of Oxford he became a management consultant, but left after working in New York City for a while.

In 1986 Singh-Watson returned to the farm, deciding to convert it to farming organically. In the 1990s, to find an effective way of distributing his produce, he developed the weekly vegetable box scheme, which is delivered direct to customers' doors with locally grown produce. In 2015 the Riverford business was valued at £45 million. In June 2018 it was announced that Riverford would transition to employee ownership, with 74% of the business being held in a trust overseen by a board.

Singh-Watson lectures on ethical business and is a judge for the Observer Ethical Awards and his leadership has seen five previous Observer awards including Best Ethical Business  and Best Ethical Restaurant in 2009.

Singh-Watson married Geetie Singh in 2014. He is a keen surfboarder. In July 2018 he was interviewed on BBC Radio 4's Desert Island Discs programme.

In 2018 Singh-Watson sold 76% of  Riverford Organic Farmers to the trustee of an employee ownership trust.

Publications
Riverford Farm Cook Book: Tales from the Fields, Recipes from the Kitchen (2008) Singh-Watson, G. and Baxter, J.

References

External links
 Triodos Bank: interview with Guy Watson October 2011
 About Guy Singh-Watson - Riverford Organic Farmers
 Guy Singh-Watson interview on BBC Radio 4 Desert Island Discs, 1 July 2018

1960 births
Living people
Alumni of the University of Oxford
21st-century British farmers
People from Buckfastleigh
People from Totnes